Capellani is a surname. Notable people with the surname include:

Albert Capellani (1874–1931), French film director and screenwriter
Paul Capellani (1877–1960), French actor
Roger Capellani (1905–1940), French film director, son of Albert and nephew of Paul